More Cole Español is a 1962 studio album by Nat King Cole, arranged by Ralph Carmichael and recorded in Mexico City.

This was Cole's third and last album of Spanish themed music, following Cole Español (1958) and A Mis Amigos (1959).

Reception

The AllMusic review by William Ruhlmann awarded the album three and a half stars, and said that compared to his two other Spanish albums Cole "still didn't sound like he always knew what he was singing, and he still seemed to be working on his pronunciation, but on More Cole Español he was clearly having a lot more fun."

Track listing
 "La Feria de Las Flores" - 1:49
 "Guadalajara" - 2:02
 "La Golondrina (The Swallow)" - 2:57
 "Tres Palabras (Without You)" (Osvaldo Farres) - 2:07
 "Piel Canela" - 2:09
 "Solamente Una Vez (You Belong to My Heart)" (Agustín Lara) - 2:47
 "Las Chiapanecas (While There's Music, There's Romance)" (Alberto De Campo) - 2:35
 "Vaya con Dios (May God Be With You)" - 2:32
 "Adiós Mariquita Linda (Adios and Farewell)" - 2:53
 "No Me Platiques" - 3:02
 "Aquí Se Habla en Amor (Love Is Spoken Here)" - 2:01
 "A Media Luz (When Lights Are Soft and Low)" - 2:10

Personnel
Nat King Cole - vocals
Ralph Carmichael - arranger

References

Capitol Records albums
Albums arranged by Ralph Carmichael
Spanish-language albums
Nat King Cole albums
1962 albums
Latin music albums by American artists